Roman Borisovich Gromadsky (December 18, 1940 – August 28, 2021) was a Soviet and Russian theater and film actor and theater teacher. He was awarded People's Artist of the RSFSR in 1983.

Selected filmography
Two Tickets for a Daytime Picture Show  (1967) as hussar
The Green Carriage  (1967) as criminal man
King Lear (1971) as Gloucester's  servant
A Lover's Romance (1974) as Solovyov
Tsarevich Alexei (1997) as episode (uncredited)
The Circus Burned Down, and the Clowns Have Gone (1998) as Pyotr Stepanovich
Empire Under Attack  (2000) as Stranden
Secrets of Investigation  (2004) as Kumachyov

References

1940 births
2021 deaths
Russian male actors
Soviet male actors
Russian male stage actors
Soviet male stage actors
Russian male film actors
Soviet male film actors
Russian male television actors
Soviet male television actors
Honored Artists of the RSFSR
People's Artists of the RSFSR
Saint Peter's School (Saint Petersburg) alumni
Russian State Institute of Performing Arts alumni
Male actors from Saint Petersburg
Recipients of the Order of Honour (Russia)
Recipients of the Order of the Red Banner of Labour